Priya Marathe Moghe is an Indian actress. She is best known for her roles as Varsha in the television series Pavitra Rishta and as Bhavani Rathod on Saath Nibhaana Saathiya. Currently she is playing role of Monica Kamat in Star Pravah's Marathi TV series Tuzech Mi Geet Gaat Aahe.

Career
Priya Marathe made her television debut with Ya Sukhano Ya and eventually went on to appear in several other Marathi serial including Char Divas Sasuche. Her first Hindi series appearance was in Kasamh Se where she played Vidya Bali, and eventually appeared in a season of Comedy Circus. She played Varsha in the TV series Pavitra Rishta. She also appeared briefly in Bade Achhe Lagte Hain as Jyoti Malhotra. She also worked in a Marathi serial Tu Tithe Me in a negative role of Priya Mohite. In February 2017, she joined the cast of Star Plus's show Saath Nibhaana Saathiya. She played the role of Bhavani Rathod in the show, an evil natured woman who has killed her husband.

Personal life
Priya Marathe married her longtime friend, actor Shantanu Moghe, son of actor Shrikant Moghe, on 24 April 2012.

Filmography

Films

Television

References

External links
 

Living people
Indian television actresses
Indian soap opera actresses
21st-century Indian actresses
Actresses in Hindi television
Actresses in Marathi television
Marathi actors
1987 births